Dosim Station is a station on the Gyeongui-Jungang Line in Namyangju.

References

External links
 Station information from Korail

Seoul Metropolitan Subway stations
Metro stations in Namyangju
Railway stations opened in 2007